A round, in the esoteric cosmology of Theosophy, Anthroposophy and Rosicrucianism, is a cosmic cycle or sequence by which an evolving reincarnating being passes through the various stages of existence as the Earth, the Solar System or the Cosmos comes into and passes out of manifestation.

Theosophy
In Theosophy, a round is a process in a planetary chain, according to which a life cycle or life-wave of souls or monads begins its evolutionary journey on the first and most subtle or spiritual of the series of seven globes; then finishing its evolution there, proceeds to the next, and so on, to the densest or most manifest globe (usually called globe D), which in our case is the gross, physical Earth. From there it proceeds on the ascending arc, through increasingly more ethereal globes. Each of these globes are in coadunition with the physical Earth, though they are not in consubstantiation with it. Each of these stages is called a round, and during this time the reincarnating life wave has passed through seven Root Races.

When the life wave has gone through all seven globes of the planetary chain, it has completed one planetary round or globe manvantara. This is followed by the dissolution of the planetary chain in a nirvana (which is not the same as what Buddhism calls nirvana because it is not permanent); this period between physical manifestation is called pralaya in Hinduism.  Finally, a new round begins, in which consciousness is now more developed than in the preceding round.

Seven such planetary rounds (or forty-nine globe rounds) represents one kalpa (day of Brahma) or manvantara. This is followed by a higher "nirvana" or pralaya, which is the pralaya of that planetary chain. This lasts until a new planetary chain forms with its various life waves.

Seven such planetary chains and their pralayas constitute a solar manvantara, after which the Solar System is dissolved in a cosmic pralaya, before the cycle begins anew.

This elaborate cosmology, first formulated by Blavatsky, was also taught by de Purucker, Leadbeater, and Alice Bailey.

Anthroposophy
Rudolf Steiner retained the basic concept of root races and sevenfold cycles within cycles, but his description is considerably simpler, concentrating only on the seven cycles of the present Solar System. Each of these cycles constitutes a coming into being and passing out of being of the solar system, and each is divided into seven rounds, upon which man passes through seven root races. Each of Steiner's seven rounds is related to a metamorphosis of the Earth:
 Ancient Saturn
During the Ancient Saturn round, the life wave of human beings underwent the mineral stage, endowed only with a physical vehicle.
 Ancient Sun
During the Ancient Sun round, human beings underwent the plant stage, being endowed with a physical and an etheric vehicle.
 Ancient Moon
During the Ancient Moon round, human beings underwent the animal stage, endowed with a physical, an etheric, and an astral vehicle. Meanwhile, the present Angels were undergoing the human stage, while the present Archangels were undergoing the Angel stage, and so on.
 Earth
During the Earth round, human beings undergo the man stage.
 Jupiter
During the Jupiter round, human beings will undergo the soul man stage.
 Venus
During the Venus round, human beings will undergo the higher soul man stage.
 Vulcan
During the Vulcan round, human beings will undergo the spiritual man stage.
For Steiner, the animal, vegetable, and mineral kingdoms represent "cast off" elements of the human entity from previous rounds. These teachings have been incorporated into the Anthroposophical Society that Steiner founded.

Rosicrucian
According to Max Heindel's Rosicrucian writings about the scheme of evolution, in the beginning of a Day of Manifestation a certain collective Great Being, God, limits Himself to a certain portion of space, in which He elects to create a Solar System for the evolution of added self-consciousness. In God there are contained hosts of glorious Hierarchies and lesser beings of every grade of intelligence and stage of consciousness, from omniscience to an unconsciousness deeper than that of the deepest trance condition.
During the current period of manifestation these various grades of beings are working to acquire more experience than they possessed at the beginning of this period of existence. Those who, in previous manifestations, have attained to the highest degree of development work on those who have not yet evolved any consciousness.

The period of time devoted to the attainment of self-consciousness and to the building of the vehicles through which the spirit in man manifests, is called "Involution". The succeeding period of existence, during which the individual human being develops self-consciousness into divine omniscience, is called "Evolution". Every evolving being has within him a "force" which makes evolution not to be a mere unfoldment of latent germinal possibilities but a process where each individual differs from that of every other. This force, called "Epigenesis" provides the element of originality and gives scope to the creative ability which the evolving being is to cultivate in order that he may become a God.

Heindel states that in the Solar System, God's Habitation, there are seven Worlds differentiated by God, within Himself, one after another. These Worlds have each a different "measure" and rate of vibration and are not separated by space or distance, as is the earth from the other planets. They are states of matter, of varying density and vibration (as are the solids, liquids and gases of the physical Earth). These Worlds are not instantaneously created at the beginning of a day of Manifestation, nor do they last until the end. The evolutionary scheme is carried through five of these Worlds in seven great Periods of manifestation, during which the evolving virgin spirit becomes first human and, then, a God.
The highest Worlds are created first, and as involution is to slowly carry the life into denser and denser matter for the building of forms, the finer Worlds gradually condense and new Worlds are differentiated within God to furnish the necessary links between Himself and the Worlds which have consolidated. In due time the point of greatest density, the nadir of materiality, is reached. From that point the life begins to ascend into higher Worlds, as evolution proceeds. That leaves the denser Worlds depopulated, one by one. When the purpose has been served for which a particular World was created, God ends its existence, which has become superfluous, by ceasing within Himself the particular activity which brought into being and sustained that World.

References

 Powell, A.E. The Solar System: A Complete Outline of the Theosophical Scheme of Evolution London:1930 The Theosophical Publishing House
 de Purucker, G, Occult Glossary - a Compendium of Oriental and Theosophical Terms
 Arthur E. The Causal Body and the Ego
 Steiner, Rudolph, Occult science – An Outline. Trans. George and Mary Adams. London: Rudolf Steiner Press, 1909, 1969
 Heindel, Max, The Rosicrucian Cosmo-Conception, first edition in 1909 www.rosicrucian.com

External links
 Steiner's Occult Cosmology

Esoteric cosmology
Theosophical philosophical concepts